Hugo Rafael Soto (born 16 August 1967 in San Fernando del Valle de Catamarca, Argentina) is a former professional boxer.

Professional career

Fighting in the flyweight and super flyweight divisions, Soto had his first professional fight in 1988. He built up a record of 39-1-2 to earn a fight with WBC flyweight champion Yuri Arbachakov, but lost by an eighth round knockout. Two years later, he lost a unanimous decision to reigning WBO flyweight champion Johnny Tapia. He captured the WBA flyweight title in May 1998, defeating Jose Bonilla by a split decision. Soto lost the title in his first defence against Leo Gámez, who knocked him out in the third round. He had his final fight in 2004, losing a decision to future world champion Jorge Linares, and retired with a final record of 55-10-2.

Professional boxing record

See also
List of flyweight boxing champions

External links

1967 births
Living people
Flyweight boxers
Super-flyweight boxers
Bantamweight boxers
Super-bantamweight boxers
World flyweight boxing champions
World Boxing Association champions
People from Catamarca Province
Argentine male boxers